Svat Soucek (full name Svatopluk Souček) is a compiler and author of works in relation to Central Asia, and Central Asian studies. He was born in Prague, Czech Republic. He has a PhD in Turkish and Arabic studies from Columbia University. He worked in the Oriental Division of the New York Public Library, and as a professor of history at Princeton University, specialising in historical cartography. His works include Piri Reis and Turkish Mapmaking After Columbus (1996), A History of Inner Asia (2000), The Persian Gulf: Its Past and Present (2008), and The History of the Maritime Wars of the Turks (2012).

References

Further reading
 
 
 
 

Living people
Year of birth missing (living people)
Central Asian studies scholars
21st-century Czech historians
21st-century American historians
21st-century American male writers
American male non-fiction writers